The 1970 European Figure Skating Championships was a senior-level international competition held at the Yubileyny Sports Palace in Leningrad, Soviet Union from February 4 to 8, 1970. Elite senior-level figure skaters from European ISU member nations competed for the title of European Champion in the disciplines of men's singles, ladies' singles, pair skating, and ice dancing.

Results

Men

Ladies

Pairs

Ice dancing

References

External links
 results

European Figure Skating Championships, 1970
European Figure Skating Championships
European Figure Skating Championships
Figure skating in the Soviet Union
International figure skating competitions hosted by the Soviet Union
Sports competitions in Saint Petersburg
1970s in Leningrad
European Figure Skating Championships